Marrowbone may refer to the following:

Places
Marrowbone, Cumberland County, Kentucky, U.S.
Marrowbone, Pike County, Kentucky, U.S.
Marrowbone Township, Moultrie County, Illinois, U.S.
Marrowbone Lane in Dublin, Ireland

Other uses
Marrowbone (film), a 2017 Spanish film

See also

Bone marrow
Marrow (disambiguation)
Marrow Bone Spring Archeological Site, in Vandergriff Park in Arlington, Texas, U.S.